Garbage Island may refer to:

 Great Pacific garbage patch
 "Garbage Island" (How I Met Your Mother)
 Garbage patch ocean debris pollution

See also
 "Toxic Garbage Island", a song by Gojira on their 2008 album The Way of All Flesh